Everdon is a village in West Northamptonshire in England, some  south of Daventry. The population of the civil parish (including Little Everdon) at the 2011 census was 356.

Nearby, The Stubbs is a wood belonging to the Woodland Trust, a UK conservation charity. The village's former school is now an activities centre for conservation studies.

To the north of Everdon is the hamlet of Little Everdon and to its south lies the shrunken village of Snorscombe.

History
The villages name means 'Wild boar hill'.

Domesday entry: Bishop of Bayeux's fief. William held half a hide in Great Everdon. Soke of land lies in Fawsley.

In the Middle Ages, Everdon Priory was a small Benedictine priory, located at the eastern end of the village, close to a group of fish pools, which are still extant. It was a daughter house of the abbey of Bernay, in Normandy, and was granted lordship of the manor of Everdon. Like most alien priories, it was dissolved in 1415 under an Act of Henry V. In 1440 Henry VI granted the property of the priory to the newly founded Eton College, which established a manor house on the site. A junior branch of the Spencer family from Badby took up the lease of the Eton College Manor house around 1500. The manor of Everdon should not be confused with the neighbouring manor of Little Everdon, where the Cluniac monks of Daventry Priory had a mill and land.

The land was enclosed by Act of Parliament in 1764:

1801 111 houses 585 inhabitants

1811 116 houses 578 inhabitants

1821 122 houses 640 inhabitants

A charity school was established in Everdon in 1813, and in the same year an independent meeting house opened.

Everdon Stubbs
The land now covered by the woods was originally grazing land for Wild Boar, through which Everdon gets its name (from Old English eofer-dūn'boar hill'). 
In the spring the area is covered with its famous carpet of bluebells, extremely well known throughout the county. Everdon Stubbs is currently open to the public and has conservation work taking place on an ad-hoc basis.

St. Mary's Church
Located at the centre of the village, Saint Mary's church dates from the 14th century, and was built in the decorated style. It has been suggested that an earlier structure may have sat at this site prior to the current building. The list of incumbents reveals that a rector, Eias Capellinus de Everdone, was appointed in 1218 and the font certainly predates the current church.

Local ironstone was used in the construction of the church, and it is believed that the Bernay Monks were involved in the work, importing their own stonemason from France to complete the work. The parts of the building still visible, which date from the 14th century, include the north doorway, the north aisle and east windows, which are detailed with unusual tracery.

Some say that it was the churchyard of St Mary's, and not that of the Church of St Giles, Stoke Poges, that was the inspiration for Thomas Gray's famous elegy "In an English Churchyard". This theory suggested by Rev. H. Cavalier, the rector of Great Brington in 1926, is based on observations comparing the two churchyards and the lines in the poem.

Village events
The village has a very strong community spirit, with a number of events taking place on a yearly basis, one of which is the Grand Fete, usually held on the last bank holiday Monday in August. In more recent times, the Everdon Bonfire and Fireworks party, which began in 2006, has become a very successful event, raising funds for the church restoration fund.

To coincide with the bluebells of Everdon Stubbs in the spring, a team of village residents host the 'Bluebell Teas' in the village hall, with the hope that people visiting the woods will drop by.

References

External links

 Everdon Village Website
 Everdon Parish Council

Villages in Northamptonshire
West Northamptonshire District
Civil parishes in Northamptonshire